The longfin Irish lord (Hemilepidotus zapus) is a species of fish native to the north Pacific Ocean.

References

longfin Irish lord
longfin Irish lord